The following are the winners of the 31st annual Origins Award, held in 2005:

Best of Class Awards

Vanguard Awards
 All Wound Up (Twilight Creations, Inc.)
 Flames of War (Battlefront)
 Fire as She Bears! 2.1 (Starboard Tack Press)
 Pirates of the Spanish Main (WizKids, Inc.)

Gamers' Choice Awards
 Legends (PBM) (Harlequin Games)
 Desert Rats – British in the Desert (Battlefront)
 Axis and Allies D-Day (Avalon Hill)
 Babylon 5: A Call to Arms (game) (Mongoose Publishing)
 VS System, Marvel Origins and X-Men VS The Brotherhood (The Upper Deck Entertainment)
 Cthulhu 500 (Atlas Games)
 The World of Darkness: Storytelling System Rulebook (White Wolf, Inc.)
 Betrayal at House on the Hill (Avalon Hill)

Hall of Fame inductees
 Duke Seifried
 Tom Shaw

External links
 2004 Origins Awards

References

2004 awards
 
2004 awards in the United States